The Men's 200 Breaststroke event at the XI FINA World Aquatics Championships swam on 28 and 29 July 2005 in Montreal, Quebec, Canada. Preliminary (morning) and semifinal (evening) heats swam 28 July; the final on 29 July.

Prior to the competition, the existing World (WR) and Championship (CR) records were:
WR: 2:09.04 swum by Brendan Hansen (USA) on 11 July 2004 in Long Beach, USA;
CR: 2:09.42 swum by Kosuke Kitajima (Japan) on 24 July 2003 in Barcelona, Spain.

Results

Final

Semifinals

Preliminaries

References
Worlds 2005 results: Men's 200 m backstroke Heats, from OmegaTiming.com (official timer of the 2005 Worlds); Retrieved 2010-01-25.
Worlds 2005 results: Men's 200 m backstroke Semifinals, from OmegaTiming.com (official timer of the 2005 Worlds); Retrieved 2010-01-25.
Worlds 2005 results: Men's 200 m backstroke Finals, from OmegaTiming.com (official timer of the 2005 Worlds); Retrieved 2010-01-25.

Swimming at the 2005 World Aquatics Championships